Huang Zicheng (1350–1402) was a Ming dynasty imperial scholar and overseer of rituals. He was an advisor to the Jianwen Emperor. He was put to death by the Yongle Emperor. Afterwards his son changed his surname to Tian 田.

References

1350 births
1402 deaths
People of the Jingnan Campaign
Ming dynasty Hanlin Academy scholars
Ming dynasty overseer of rituals
People executed by the Ming dynasty